Collector of Russian land(s) (sobiratel russkoi zemli) is a historical concept and study of expansion policy of the Grand Duchy of Muscovy and the Grand Duchy of Lithuania. The term could be found in works of several historians such as Dmitry Ilovaysky ("History of Ruthenia: Muscovy-Lithuanian period or Collectors of Russia (Rus)"), Kazimierz Waliszewski ("First Romanovs", "Ivan Grozny") and many others. In the historical studies of Russia the concept justifies the liquidation of political (feudal) fragmentation in post Golden Horde period.

See also
 All-Russian nation
 Of all Rus'

References 

Grand Duchy of Moscow
History of Lithuania (1219–1569)
Russian nationalism